Big Branch is a stream in Audrain County in the U.S. state of Missouri. It is a tributary of Skull Lick Creek.

Big Branch was named for its relatively big size.

See also
List of rivers of Missouri

References

Rivers of Audrain County, Missouri
Rivers of Missouri